Shahryar is a crater in the northern hemisphere of Saturn's moon Enceladus. Shahryar was first seen in Voyager 2 images, but was seen at much higher resolution by the Cassini spacecraft. Despite being nearly the same size as the nearby Sindbad crater, Shahryar does not exhibit a dome-like structure on its floor, suggesting it has not undergone significant viscous relaxation. In addition, there is very little evidence that it has experienced tectonic deformation, suggesting that Shahryar is a relatively young crater.

Shahryār is named after the king from Arabian Nights, who is told tales by Scheherazade to dissuade him from continuing to kill women.

References

External links
Shahrazad (Se-4) at  PIA12783: The Enceladus Atlas

Impact craters on Enceladus